Thomas Conway was a professional association footballer from Northern Ireland who played as a full back. He played in the Football League with Burnley and Northampton Town.

References

Association footballers from Belfast
Association footballers from Northern Ireland
Association football defenders
Burnley F.C. players
Northampton Town F.C. players
English Football League players
Year of birth missing